Towson University's Jess and Mildred Fisher College of Science and Mathematics consists of five core departments:

Biological Sciences
Chemistry
Computer and Information Sciences
Mathematics
Physics, Astronomy and Geosciences

and two interdisciplinary programs:

Environmental Science and Studies (ESS)
Molecular Biology, Biochemistry and Bioinformatics (MB3).

The college additionally houses other research and education centers. It coordinates several dual degree programs, including engineering programs with the University of Maryland, College Park and Pennsylvania State University; a medicinal chemistry program with the University of Maryland School of Pharmacy, and a program with the University of Tasmania in biological sciences and aquaculture or Antarctic and southern ocean studies.

External links
Jess and Mildred Fisher College of Science and Mathematics - Towson University Website

Jess and Mildred Fisher College of Science and Mathematics